V1936 Aquilae is a blue supergiant and candidate Luminous blue variable located in the nebula Westerhout 51, in the constellation Aquila, about 20,000 light years away. The star was originally identified as a massive star in 2000, and was thought to be an O-type supergiant. However, subsequent analyses have shown it to be not O but B-type, as well as being possibly an LBV.

Properties
V1936 Aquilae is a very luminous star. The Stefan-Boltzmann Law suggests a radius of around 143 times that of the Sun.

References

Aquila (constellation)
Luminous blue variables
Aquilae, V1936
O-type supergiants